Ubiquitin-protein ligase E3A (UBE3A) also known as E6AP ubiquitin-protein ligase (E6AP) is an enzyme that in humans is encoded by the UBE3A gene. This enzyme is involved in targeting proteins for degradation within cells.

Protein degradation is a normal process that removes damaged or unnecessary proteins and helps maintain the normal functions of cells.
Ubiquitin protein ligase E3A attaches a small marker protein called ubiquitin to proteins that should be degraded. Cellular structures called proteasomes recognize and digest proteins tagged with ubiquitin.

Both copies of the UBE3A gene are active in most of the body's tissues. In most neurons, however, only the copy inherited from a person's mother (the maternal copy) is normally active; this is known as paternal imprinting. Recent evidence shows that at least some glial cells and neurons may exhibit biallelic expression of UBE3A. Further work is thus needed to delineate a complete map of UBE3A imprinting in humans and model organisms such as mice. 
Silencing of Ube3a on the paternal allele is thought to occur through the Ube3a-ATS part of a lincRNA called "LNCAT", (Large Non-Coding Antisense Transcript).

The UBE3A gene is located on the long (q) arm of chromosome 15 between positions 11 and 13, from base pair 23,133,488 to base pair 23,235,220.

Clinical significance 
Mutations within the UBE3A gene are responsible for some cases of Angelman syndrome and Prader-Willi syndrome. Most of these mutations result in an abnormally short, nonfunctional version of ubiquitin protein ligase E3A. Because the copy of the gene inherited from a person's father (the paternal copy) is normally inactive in the brain, a mutation in the remaining maternal copy prevents any of the enzyme from being produced in the brain. This loss of enzyme function likely causes the characteristic features of these two conditions.

The UBE3A gene lies within the human chromosomal region 15q11-13.  Other abnormalities in this region of chromosome 15 can also cause Angelman syndrome.  These chromosomal changes include deletions, rearrangements (translocations) of genetic material, and other abnormalities. Like mutations within the gene, these chromosomal changes prevent any functional ubiquitin protein ligase E3A from being produced in the brain.

UBE3A associates with the E6 protein of certain strains of HPV. This interaction promotes the polyubiquitination and subsequent degradation of the tumor suppressor gene p53, thereby enabling the immortalization of infected cells. Strains of HPV with this ability have a higher risk of causing HPV-associated cancers. UBE3A is also known as E6AP or E6-associated protein in reference to this mechanism.

Interactions 
UBE3A has been shown to interact with:

 BLK, 
 Lck, 
 MCM7, 
 MECP2,
 Progesterone receptor, 
 TSC2, 
 UBE2D1, 
 UBE2D2, 
 UBE2L3,
 UBQLN1,  and
 UBQLN2.

References

Further reading

External links 
  GeneReviews/NCBI/NIH/UW entry on Angelman syndrome
  OMIM entries on Angelman syndrome
 GeneCard